The DyLight Fluor family of fluorescent dyes are produced by Dyomics in collaboration with Thermo Fisher Scientific. DyLight dyes are typically used in biotechnology and research applications as biomolecule, cell and tissue labels for fluorescence microscopy, cell biology or molecular biology. 

Historically, fluorophores such as fluorescein, rhodamine, Cy3 and Cy5 have been used in a wide variety of applications. These dyes have limitations for use in microscopy and other applications that require exposure to an intense light source such as a laser, because they photobleach quickly (however, bleaching can be reduced at least 10 fold using oxygen scavenging). DyLight Fluors have comparable excitation and emission spectra and are claimed to  be more photostable, brighter, and less pH-sensitive. The excitation and emission spectra of the DyLight Fluor series cover much of the visible spectrum and extend into the infrared region, allowing detection using most fluorescence microscopes, as well as infrared imaging systems.

To use the DyLight Fluors with fluorescent imagers, use a spectral line of the blue laser diode for DyLight 405, a cyan (488 nm) laser for DyLight 488, a green (526 nm) laser for DyLight 550 and 594, and a red (633 nm) laser for DyLight 633 and 650. The DyLight 680, 755 and 800 fluors are compatible with laser- and filter-based infrared imaging instruments that emit in the 700 nm, 750 nm and 800 nm region of the spectrum, respectively.

DyLight Fluors are synthesized through sulfonate addition to coumarin, xanthene (such as fluorescein and rhodamine), and cyanine dyes.  Sulfonation makes DyLight dyes negatively charged and hydrophilic. DyLight Fluors are commercially available as reactive succinimidyl-esters for labeling proteins through lysine residues, and as maleimide derivatives for labeling proteins through cysteine residues. Antibodies conjugated are also available from several companies. 

Similar lines of fluorescent dyes provide an alternative to the DyLight Dyes (see also the list in :Category:Fluorescent dyes).

References

Dyes
Fluorescent dyes